The Curtiss K was a  water-cooled 4-cylinder in-line aero-engine.

References

Curtiss aircraft engines